Maurice Cole (30 April 1901 – 23 January 1971) was a South African cricketer. He played in eighteen first-class matches from 1921/22 to 1934/35.

References

External links
 

1901 births
1971 deaths
South African cricketers
Eastern Province cricketers
Free State cricketers
People from Uitenhage
Cricketers from the Eastern Cape